Balibar may refer to:

 Étienne Balibar (born 1942), French philosopher
 Françoise Balibar
 Jeanne Balibar
 Balibar (Dili), a suco of East Timor